Gustavo Piga (18 February 1964), is an Italian economist.
He is professor of Political economy at University of Rome Tor Vergata.

In 1996 attained the PhD in Economics at Columbia University. In 1997-98 taught Accounting and Finance at the Department of Economics of Columbia University. He wrote the contentious Derivatives in Pulicc Debt Management in 2001.
He edited Revisiting Keynes" with Lorenzo Pecchi for MIT Press and the "handbook of Procurement" with Nicola Dimitri and Giancarlo Spagnolo for Cambridge University Press. 
In 2002-2005 he was the president of Consip.
He is currently member of the Scientific Committee of the Italian Congressional Budget Office and Director of the Global Governance Undergraduate degree.

WorksApprofondimenti di economia politica, Roma, La Sapienza, 1996Who's afraid of index-linked bonds?, with Lorenzo Pecchi, Roma, Università degli studi La Sapienza, 1996On the sources of the inflationary-bias and output variability, Roma, Università Luiss Guido Carli, 1999The link between the size and the management of public debt: the role of bond ownership in the italian case, with Giorgio Valente, Roma, Universita Luiss Guido Caarli, 1999Capital accumulation, productivity and growth: monitoring Italy 2005, with Marco Malgarini, Basingstoke; New York: PalgraveLezioni di microeconomia, Torino, Giappichelli, [2008]Budget rules versus budget flexibility: a political equilibrium approach, Roma, Università Luiss, 1994EMU and public debt management: one money, one debt?, with Carlo Favero, Alessandro MissaleThe politics of index-linked bonds, with Lorenzo Pecchi, Roma: Università Luiss Guido Carli, 1997Managing public debt: index-linked bonds in theory and practice, with Marcello De Cecco, Lorenzo Pecchi, Cheltenham, UK, Brookfield, US, Elgar, 1997Public debt management in the European monetary union, Roma, Università Luiss Guido Carli, 1999Handbook of procurement, with Nicola Dimitri, Giancarlo Spagnolo, Cambridge, Cambridge University Press, 2006Regole per il mercato, with Mario Baldassarri, Giampaolo Galli, Milano, Il Sole 24 ore, 2002L' esternalizzazione dei processi gestionali: l'impatto sulle imprese e le prospettive per il Sistema Italia, with Corrado Cerruti, Riccardo Pacini, Il Sole 24 ore, 2008Approfondimenti di economia politica, Roma, Euroma, stampa 1998Understanding the high interest rates on Italian government securities, with Alberto Giovannini, Roma, Luiss University, 1992The Italian term structure of interest rates and the government issuance policy, with Giorgio Valente, Roma, Luiss edizioni, 2001In search of an independent province for the treasuries: how should governments announce debt issues?, Roma, Università degli studi La Sapienza, 1995Esercizi di economia politica with Valerio Crispolti, Roma, NIS, 1997The economics of public procurement, with Khi V. Thai, Basingstoke; New York, Palgrave Macmillan, 2007Il ventunesimo secolo di Keynes. Economia e società per le nuove generazioni'', with Lorenzo Pecchi, Roma, Luiss University Press, 2011

References

1964 births
Living people
Academic staff of the University of Rome Tor Vergata